The Phone (Korean: 더 폰) is a 2015 South Korean action thriller film directed by Kim Bong-ju. The film is the directorial debut of the director. It was released on October 22, 2015. This film is not to be confused with another South Korean film of similar title but released in 2002 or with the American TV series and the Dutch TV reality show both of which have the same title as this film.

Plot 
A man (Son Hyun-joo) became broken-hearted after the murder of his wife (Uhm Ji-won). A magnetic field anomaly allows him to talk on the telephone with his wife from the past. Can he prevent her murder?

Cast 
Son Hyun-joo as Ko Dong-Ho
Uhm Ji-won as Jo Yeong-Soo
Bae Seong-woo as Do Jae-Hyun
Hwang Bo-ra as Kim Hye-Jin
Roh Jeong-eui as Ko Kyung-Rim
Jang In-sub as Department Head Kim
Jo Dal-Hwan as Kim Gyu-Soo
Lee Cheol-Min as Son Suk-Ho
Park Ji-So as Do Soo-Jung
Hwang Suk-Jung as Seo Kwang-Hyun
Kim Jong-Goo as Park Se-Moon
Lee Soo-In as resident
Kim Ki-Cheon as police substation chief
Lee Sang-Hwa as hunting man
Song Bong-Geun as Detective Song

Reception
By its third weekend, it had earned .

References

External links

The Phone (2015) at HanCinema

2015 action thriller films
2015 fantasy films
2015 directorial debut films
2015 films
Next Entertainment World films
South Korean action thriller films
South Korean fantasy films
Films about telephony
2010s South Korean films